Dudley Hill railway station was a railway station that served Dudley Hill, West Yorkshire, England.

History
The line was open to passengers on 20 August 1856 and to goods traffic on 1 January 1857. The station closed in 1952 but passenger services on the line continued until 4 July 1966 and goods traffic continued until 1981.

References

Disused railway stations in Bradford
Former Great Northern Railway stations
Railway stations in Great Britain closed in 1856
Railway stations in Great Britain closed in 1952
1856 establishments in England